Coriolanus is a tragedy by William Shakespeare.

Coriolanus or Coriolan may also refer to:

People or fictional characters
 Anne Marie Coriolan, Haitian feminist and activist
 Coriolanus Snow, a fictional character in the Hunger Games trilogy Coriolan Ardouin, Haitian romantic poet
 Coriolan Brediceanu, Austro-Hungarian Romanian lawyer and politician
 Coriolan Suciu, Austro-Hungarian-born Romanian teacher and historian
 Gaius Marcius Coriolanus, a Roman general in the 5th century BC and the protagonist of Shakespeare's play

Films or playsCoriolan', a 1804 play by Heinrich Joseph von Collin
 Coriolanus (Brecht), Bertolt Brecht's 1950s adaptation of Shakespeare's play
 Coriolanus (film), a 2011 film adaptation of Shakespeare's play by Ralph Fiennes
 Coriolanus: Hero without a Country, a 1964 Italian film with Gordon Scott

Music
 Coriolan Overture, a 1807 composition by Ludwig van Beethoven for Collin's play
 Coriolano ossia L'assedio di Roma'', 1808 opera seria by  Giuseppe Nicolini